Chahu-ye Sharqi (also Romanized as Chāhū-ye Sharqī) is a village in Dulab Rural District, Shahab District, Qeshm County, Hormozgan Province, Iran. At the 2006 census, its population was 919, in 202 families. The village is a coastal town located near the Strait of Hormuz. Nearby tourist attractions include the Chahkooh Canyon.

References 

Populated places in Qeshm County